Charlie Chan at the Circus is the 11th film produced by Fox starring Warner Oland as Charlie Chan. A seemingly harmless family outing drags a vacationing Chan into a murder investigation.

The film's sets were designed by the art director Duncan Cramer.

Plot 
Charlie Chan takes his wife and twelve children on an outing to a circus after receiving a free pass from one of the owners, Joe Kinney. Kinney wants Chan to find out who is sending him anonymous threatening letters. Nearly all of the circus workers are suspects, since Kinney is very unpopular. However, when Chan goes to meet him during the night's performance, he finds the man dead, seemingly killed by a rampaging gorilla who somehow escaped from his cage.

Lieutenant Macy takes charge of the investigation, assisted by Chan and his overzealous eldest son Lee, who also takes the opportunity to (unsuccessfully) romance Su Toy (Toshia Mori, credited as Shia Jung), the contortionist. On Chan's advice, Macy lets the circus continue on to its next stop, with the trio tagging along. During the train ride, an attempt is made to murder Chan with a poisonous cobra.

Then someone tries to break into the circus's safe, but nothing is missing. Macy finds a marriage certificate inside, showing that Kinney supposedly married circus wardrobe lady Nellie Farrell in Mexico. However, Kinney's fiance Marie Norman claims that she can prove Kinney was not in Mexico the day indicated on the certificate. Before she can prove it, during her act, someone shoots one of the ropes of her trapeze swing and she falls to the ground, seriously injured, but still alive.

A doctor is summoned. Chan states that Marie is too badly hurt to move, so the doctor must operate on the spot. Chan asks everyone to keep quiet and clear the area, so as not to cause a potentially fatal distraction for the medical staff during the delicate operation.

Meanwhile, Chan has noticed a newspaper article about a crime committed at a casino the day of Kinney's alleged marriage. He sends his son to phone for a description of the crooks involved from the police. When Lee returns, he sees a man slug the policeman guarding the gorilla's cage and let the ape out again. He struggles with the man, but is knocked out.

The gorilla reaches the tent where the operation is in progress and tries to cause trouble. The operation is a fake, as is the gorilla. He is shot to death by policemen masquerading as doctors. It is revealed to be snake charmer Tom Holt in a costume, trying to pin a second death on the escaped animal. He and Kinney had robbed the casino and hidden out at the circus. However they had had a falling out over the division of the money, leading to Kinney's murder. Nellie Farrell and her brother Dan are also arrested for trying to use a forgery to gain half interest in the circus. Charlie Chan agrees to obtain a lifetime pass to the circus for his family. He sees Lee Chan and Su Toy having some romance together wondering if any future grandchildren will be able to see the circus, too.

Cast 
 Warner Oland as Charlie Chan
 Keye Luke as Charlie's Number One Son, Lee Chan
 George Brasno as Colonel Tim, a midget performer at the circus
 Olive Brasno as Lady Tiny, Colonel Tim's midget wife
 Francis Ford as John Gaines, half owner of the circus 
 Maxine Reiner as Marie Norman, an aerialist and fiancée of Joe Kinney
 John McGuire as Hal Blake
 Shirley Deane as Louise Norman, Marie's sister 
 Paul Stanton as Joe Kinney, the other half owner
 J. Carrol Naish as Tom Holt
 Booth Howard as Dan Farrell
 Drue Leyton as Nellie Farrell
 Wade Boteler as Lieutenant Macy
 Shia Jung as Su Toy, a contortionist (love interest to Lee Chan)

Reception
Writing for The Spectator in 1936, Graham Greene gave the film a good review claiming that "Charlie Chan [] needs no recommendation". Greene noted that as yet the Charlie Chan films had been "always well made and well acted", and that "the new picture is particularly agreeable" due to the audience's introduction to Chan's complete family.

References

External links

1936 films
American black-and-white films
Charlie Chan films
Circus films
Films directed by Harry Lachman
20th Century Fox films
American mystery films
1930s mystery films
1930s crime comedy films
American crime comedy films
1936 comedy films
1930s American films